Fritz Schmid may refer to:

 Fritz Schmid (singer) (born 1972), Austrian tenor
 Fritz Schmid (football manager) (born 1959), Swiss football manager